Kumakura (written: 熊倉) is a Japanese surname. Notable people with the surname include:

, Japanese actor, voice actor and theatre director
, Japanese rower
 Shino Miyaso (née Shino Kumakura), Japanese women's professional shogi player
, Japanese volleyball player

Japanese-language surnames